Pliocercus is a genus of snakes in the subfamily Dipsadinae.

Geographic range
Species in the genus Pliocercus are found in Mexico, Central America, and northern South America.

Species and subspecies
The following species and subspecies are recognized as being valid.
Pliocercus elapoides 
Pliocercus elapoides aequalis 
Pliocercus elapoides diastema 
Pliocercus elapoides elapoides 
Pliocercus elapoides occidentalis 
Pliocercus euryzonus 
Pliocercus euryzonus burghardti 
Pliocercus euryzonus euryzonus 

Nota bene: A trinomial authority in parentheses indicates that the subspecies was originally described in a genus other than Pliocercus.

References

Further reading
Cope ED (1860). "Catalogue of the Colubridæ in the Museum of the Academy of Natural Sciences of Philadelphia, with notes and descriptions of new species. Part 2". Proc. Acad. Nat. Sci. Philadelphia [12]: 241-266. (Pliocercus, new genus, p. 253; P. elapoides, new species, pp. 253–254).

Pliocercus
Snake genera